Richard Caswell (August 3, 1729November 10, 1789) was an American politician and lawyer who served as the first and fifth governor of the U.S. state of North Carolina from 1776 to 1780 and from 1785 to 1787. He also served as a senior officer of militia in the Southern theater of the American Revolutionary War. As a delegate to the First Continental Congress, he was a signatory of the 1774 Continental Association.

Early life 
Caswell was born on August 3, 1729, in Harford County (present-day Baltimore), Maryland; one of eleven children born to Richard and Christian Caswell. The Caswells moved to New Bern, North Carolina, in 1745. He was appointed deputy surveyor for the province in 1750. While a member of the North Carolina House of Burgesses, a position he held for 17 years, Caswell introduced a bill establishing the "Town of Kingston" (which was later changed to Kinston as a result of the American Revolutionary War). He was a prosperous lawyer, farmer, land speculator, tanner, and grand master of North Carolina.

Military service 
Caswell fought the Regulators at Alamance (1771) during the Regulator Movement, where it is thought he commanded the right wing of Governor Tryon's forces.

American Revolutionary War 
Caswell represented North Carolina in the Continental Congresses of 1774 and 1775. When the militia district of New Bern was formed on May 4, 1776; Caswell was appointed to command that minuteman region. As such, he led the Provincial Congress' force at the Battle of Moore's Creek Bridge (1776). Soon after that, the Provincial Congress disbanded minuteman battalions in favor of militia. In 1780, he was commissioned major general of militia and state troops. At the Battle of Camden Court House in 1780, his troops fled after Virginia militia broke and ran in panic, exposing him to attack without greater defense, leaving the Continentals behind to suffer defeat.

After his defeat at Camden Court House, Caswell returned home with an unnamed illness. In the meantime, the North Carolina General Assembly appointed William Smallwood of Maryland to the command of North Carolina's militia without informing Caswell, so he resigned on October 21, 1780. When Smallwood returned to Maryland in January 1781, the General Assembly once again appointed Caswell major general of militia, and he retained the position until the end of the American Revolution.

Effective dates of promotion 
Colonel of militia (1775)
Brigadier General of militia (1776)
Major General of militia (1780)

Governor (1776–1780) 
Caswell was president of the North Carolina Provincial Congress that wrote the first Constitution of North Carolina in 1776. As the congress adjourned, it elected him acting governor. He took the oath of office on January 16, 1777. Under the new constitution, the state Legislature ("General Assembly") re-elected him as the first governor in April 1777. Caswell stepped down in 1780, as the state constitution allowed only three consecutive one-year terms to command the militia.

Later career 
Caswell served as the comptroller of North Carolina and as a member of the North Carolina Senate between his two gubernatorial terms. Caswell was also chosen to be one of North Carolina's delegates to the United States Constitutional Convention of 1787, but he did not attend. At the time of his death in 1789, he had returned once again to the North Carolina General Assembly, this time serving as Speaker of the Senate.

Personal life 

Caswell married Mary Mackilwean, the daughter of James and Elinor Mackilwean. They had three children, including a daughter that died at birth in 1753, William Caswell born in 1754, and another daughter born in 1757, who died as an infant. Mary Caswell died from complications of childbirth. The family lived on a plantation home called Red House, which is the site of the Richard Caswell Memorial Park in Kinston, North Carolina.

After Mary's death, Caswell married Sarah Heritage (17401794) on June 20, 1758. Mary was the daughter of William Heritage and Susannah Moore. They had eight children:  Richard Caswell, born in 1759; Sarah Caswell, born in 1762; Winston Caswell, born in 1764; Anna Caswell, born in 1766; Dallam Caswell, born in 1769; John Caswell, born in 1772; Susannah Caswell, born in 1775, and Christian Caswell, born in 1779.

Caswell's son Richard was colonel of Dobbs Regiment and lieutenant colonel of the 2nd North Carolina Regiment during the American Revolutionary War. He was lost at sea in 1784. William, a son by his first marriage, was also colonel of Dobbs Regiment and brigadier general and in command of New Bern District during the war.

Death and legacy 
Caswell died in Fayetteville, North Carolina, on November 10, 1789. According to tradition, his body was returned to Kinston for burial in the Caswell family cemetery, near where a memorial and museum stands today.

Among his many accomplishments was Caswell's proposal to use the reimbursement funds for aid rendered to the Crown during the French and Indian War for erecting and establishing a free school in every county. His "Address to the General Assembly" in 1760 on this topic was used for many years by other politicians in favor of public education. He also wrote the proposal into the first North Carolina constitution in 1776. Caswell County, North Carolina, and Fort Caswell were named for him. The Richard Caswell Memorial Museum was established in Kinston, near where he may have been buried.

References

Further reading

External links

Richard Caswell Papers in the Library Wilson Library at the University of North Carolina at Chapel Hill
 

 
 

1729 births
1789 deaths
18th-century American lawyers
18th-century American politicians
American Freemasons
American rebels
American slave owners
American surveyors
Burials in North Carolina
Continental Congressmen from North Carolina
Farmers from North Carolina
Governors of North Carolina
Masonic Grand Masters
Militia generals in the American Revolution
North Carolina lawyers
North Carolina militiamen in the American Revolution
People from Dobbs County, North Carolina
People from Harford County, Maryland
Members of the North Carolina House of Burgesses
Members of the North Carolina Provincial Congresses
Signers of the Continental Association